The Dearing House is a historic house on the west side of Arkansas Highway 122, between 7th and 8th Streets, in Newark, Arkansas. It is a -story wood-frame structure, with an L-shaped cross-gable configuration, and clapboard siding. It has several porches decorated with Victorian woodwork and turned posts. It was moved by its builder, Thomas Dearing, to Newark in 1901, and the second story was added in 1914.

The house was listed on the National Register of Historic Places in 1976.

See also
National Register of Historic Places listings in Independence County, Arkansas

References

Houses on the National Register of Historic Places in Arkansas
Houses in Independence County, Arkansas
National Register of Historic Places in Independence County, Arkansas
Houses completed in 1890
Relocated buildings and structures in Arkansas
1890 establishments in Arkansas
Victorian architecture in Arkansas